Charles A. "Shy" Huntington (July 7, 1891 – January 1973) was a quarterback and later a multi-sport coach at the University of Oregon.

Playing and coaching career
Huntington began his football career as a quarterback and safety at the University of Oregon.  He was the critical player in Oregon's Rose Bowl upset over heavily favored Pennsylvania in 1917, throwing a touchdown pass and intercepting three passes on defense as the Ducks won 14–0.

Huntington took over as head coach for the Ducks in 1918. He would coach the Ducks for six seasons.  He finished with a 26–12–6 record.  In 1919, he coached the Ducks to a Rose Bowl berth; they lost to Harvard, 7–6, on January 1, 1920.

He served as Oregon's baseball coach in 1919 and 1920, and he coached the basketball team for one season, 1919–20, achieving a record of eight wins and nine losses.

Huntington was a member of the Ku Klux Klan during his time as head coach.

Head coaching record

Football

References

1891 births
1973 deaths
Oregon Ducks baseball coaches
Oregon Ducks football coaches
Oregon Ducks football players
Oregon Ducks men's basketball coaches